Armando Ochoa, also known as El Graduado, is a fictional character and comic book supervillain created by Richard Dominguez and published by Azteca Productions. The character made his first appearance in El Gato Negro #1 (October 1993).

Son of the successful South Texas businessman and drug-lord Boss Ochoa, El Graduado vies to usurp his father’s throne and earn a seat in a criminal organization known as The Annulus. Earning the nickname of El Graduado, The Graduate, after graduating from a prestigious Ivy League University in the United States, El Graduado has proven himself to be a powerful adversary of high intellect and superb fighting ability.

Publication history
El Graduado made his first published appearance in the "Unknown Passing, Unforgettable Return" El Gato Negro #1 (October 1993). In his first introduction, El Graduado is already a feared gang leader. He is depicted as an extremely intelligent man who often condescends to those he considers of lesser intelligence.  Dominguez described the character as a "spoiled rich brat" who despite being a very educated person, chose to invest in corruption. El Graduado is also shown to have little regard for human life, easily murdering his own henchmen for their failures, and has admitted to enjoying the power of wielding a sniper rifle.

Fictional character history
Raised entirely by his father, Boss Ochoa spared no expense on his son's education by sending him to the finest schools in the world. Armando attended a University in Bogotá where he developed a romantic relationship with fellow student Narcilina Montoya, with whom he later studied in Harvard Law. Armando later traveled orient, where he studied amongst the most prestigious martial arts schools.

In the "Unknown Passing, Unforgettable Return" storyline from El Gato Negro #1-3, Armando wants to replace his father as the prominent druglord in South Texas, Armando adopted the pseudonym of El Graduado. In order to impress the Annulus, El Graduado attempts to make a large drug trafficking deal. After being foiled at every turn by El Gato Negro, he resolved to kill the vigilante or risk embarrassment. In a final confrontation with El Gato, the villain had the upper-hand until the arrival of the Texas Rangers. El Graduado was arrested, leaving his father to answer to the wrath of the Annulus.

1997's "Enter: The Dogs of War!" storyline mentioned El Graduado awaiting trial in Houston. In retaliation against El Gato Negro, Boss Ochoa enlists his nephews to assassinate El Gato Negro. In the ongoing "Legacy" storyline from El Gato Negro: Nocturnal Warrior #1-3 El Graduado is shown to be released from jail and executing rival mob bosses.

References

External links
El Gato Negro's MySpace page
Dominguez Illustrations
Azteca Productions' Comicspace page

Azteca Productions characters
Fictional gangsters
Fictional murderers